Orthotylus stratensis is a species of bug from a family of Miridae that is endemic to Greece.

References

Insects described in 1963
Endemic fauna of Greece
Hemiptera of Europe
stratensis